Natalie Wood: What Remains Behind is an American documentary that premiered at the 2020 Sundance Film Festival. It premiered on HBO Max on May 5, 2020, and is available to stream on Hulu and other streaming platforms. It was directed by Laurent Bouzereau and produced by Nedland Media, Amblin Television, and HBO Documentary Films. Producers include Bouzereau, Manoah Bowman, and Wood's daughter Natasha Gregson Wagner. It is rated TV-14.

Appearances

Critical response 
Natalie Wood: What Remains Behind has  rating on review aggregator Rotten Tomatoes. The site's critical consensus reads, "Though it sheds little new light on the case, What Remains Behind paints a loving portrait of a starlet and mother gone too soon." 

Some reviewers, including those from The New Yorker, The Guardian and CNN, noted Wood's conflicted psyche and the paradox of her death. Others, including Vanity Fair and the Los Angeles Times, felt the documentary's primary focus was to quell rumors that Wood's widower Robert Wagner was involved in her death.

References

External links
 
 

American documentary films
2020 documentary films
2020 films
Documentary films about women
HBO Max films
HBO documentary films
2020s English-language films
2020s American films